The SNCF Class BB 60030 diesel locomotives were built by FAMH / Jeumont for the Chemin de Fer Paris-Lyon-Méditerranée (PLM) in 1938. They were powered by Sulzer engines, producing 550 bhp, and weighed 68.5 tonnes.

Three locomotives were built. They were initially given their PLM numbers – 4.DMD.1 to 4.DMD.3, but were soon renumbered into the SNCF numbering system as 040.DD. to 040.DD.3. In 1962, they were renumbered again as BB 60031 to 60033.

Numbering

Preservation
One locomotive, BB 60032, survives in preservation at the French National Railway Museum in Mulhouse.

References

60031
Bo′Bo′ locomotives
BB 60031
Railway locomotives introduced in 1938
Standard gauge locomotives of France

Shunting locomotives